Everyman Theatre is a regional theatre with a professional repertory company of artists in downtown Baltimore, Maryland. Everyman's mission is to bring accessible and affordable theatre to the city of Baltimore. Everyman Theatre is located in downtown Baltimore in the Bromo Arts and Entertainment District.

History
Founded in 1990 by artistic director Vincent M. Lancisi, Everyman's debut production was The Runner Stumbles in Saint John's Church in Baltimore. For the next few years, Everyman only produced one production per season at various locations throughout the city. In 1995 Everyman finally had their own home in a former bowling alley on Charles Street, and offered yearly subscriptions for the first time. Everyman's first production in their own space was Buried Child by Sam Shepard.

In November 2006, Everyman Theatre made the official announcement that it had received a gift of a new home by the Bank of America and The Dawson Company:  The Town Theatre, located at 315 West Fayette Street on the West Side of Baltimore City. Everyman's new home opened as The Empire in 1910 with vaudeville performances and later hosted Yiddish theatre, boxing, and bingo parties. The original building was designed by Otto Simonson, a local architect, with William H. McElfatrick. In 1937, during its life as The Palace—a burlesque theatre—there was public uproar over the "indecency" of the performances and the theatre was closed. Shortly thereafter, and as if to ensure the death of its racy past, the theatre was converted to a parking garage. In 1947, the building was redesigned into a 1,550-seat movie house by Baltimore architect John Zink, one of the major East Coast theatre architects of the mid-twentieth century. The Town Theatre, as it was known during this period, had a glittering opening with the now-classic film “It’s a Wonderful Life, “ which was attended by star Jimmy Stewart and director Frank Capra. By 1990, The Town was in disrepair, closing its doors and remaining a vacant shadow of its former self until it was donated by the Bank of America and The Harold A. Dawson Trust to Everyman Theatre in 2006. Along with the recently restored Hippodrome Theatre and the Bromo Seltzer Arts Tower, the creation of Everyman's new home plays an important role in the renaissance of a theatre and arts district in downtown Baltimore's Westside. The restoration of the neoclassical terra cotta and granite façade represents the most historically significant aspect of the renovation. The building, valued at $1.5 million, was renovated to offer sufficient scene shops, costume and props facilities, education space, and a 253-seat state of the art theatre with more room to grow in future years. In January 2013, Everyman celebrated the grand opening of their new theatre with a production of Tracy Letts's August: Osage County.

Education Program
Everyman Theatre offers a various educational opportunities to people of all ages. The Education Department provides diverse programming, including their highly regarded high school matinee program serving Baltimore City public schools, a Residency Program that brings experiential learning into the classroom, Audience Engagement opportunities and a variety of classes for professional artists, educators and young people.

Everyman Education's high school matinee program has operated for fifteen years, and has served a selected number of Baltimore City Public High Schools during that time. The overall goal of the program is to offer students in Baltimore City an opportunity to experience live theatre and to understand the meaning of the plays, the work of the actors, the responsibilities of various theatre designers, and the importance of theatre as a universal art form. During their visit, the students have the opportunity to meet and ask questions of each play's cast and crew. The program brings students to the theatre for multiple performances during the season completely free of charge to the school and students.

Resident artists
Everyman employs a resident company of theatre artists. The Resident Acting Company includes:
Megan Anderson
Eric Berryman
Felicia Curry
Danny Gavigan
Deborah Hazlett
Helen Hedman
Paige Hernandez
Beth Hylton
Hannah Kelly
Katie Kleiger
Wil Love
Tony Nam
Bruce Randolph Nelson
Kyle Prue
Jefferson A. Russell
Carl Schurr
Dawn Ursula 
Stan Weiman
Yaegel T. Welch

The company also includes a team of resident designers and technicians. The Resident Designers include:
David Burdick, Costume Design
Harold F. Burgess III, Lighting Design
Daniel Ettinger, Scenic Design
Gary Logan, Dialect Coach
Chas Marsh, Sound Design
Lewis Shaw, Fight & Intimacy Choreographer
Cat Wallis, Stage Manager

See also
 Theater in Maryland

References

External links
 Official Official website

Downtown Baltimore
Theatres in Baltimore
Theatre companies in Maryland
Entertainment companies established in 1990
1990 establishments in Maryland
Tourist attractions in Baltimore